Anita de St. Quentin (born 13 November 1901, date of death unknown), born Anita Louise Brown-White, was a Scottish-born figure skater.

Biography 
Brown-White was born in Moffat. She married a French man named Christian de St. Quentin and moved to Nice. She represented France when she competed in the women's singles event at the 1928 Winter Olympics. She finished last in points, with a record low score, and retired from the sport after the event.

References

External links

1901 births
People from Moffat
Date of death missing
Place of death missing
British emigrants to France
Olympic figure skaters of France
Figure skaters at the 1928 Winter Olympics
French female single skaters
Scottish athletes